The Law of Love is the second novel, published in 1996 (originally published in Spanish in 1995), by the Mexican novelist Laura Esquivel. The Law of Love is a multi-genre and multi-media publication which includes elements of history, mythology, magical realism, science fiction, and features graphic novel sections that are intended to be accompanied by music from an included CD.

References

External links
  Laura Esquivel official Website

1996 novels
1996 science fiction novels
Mexican magic realism novels
Mexican science fiction
Novels set in Mexico
Three Rivers Press books